A three-part referendum was held in Crimea on 27 March 1994 alongside regional and national elections. Voters were asked whether they were in favour of greater autonomy within Ukraine, whether residents should have dual Russian and Ukrainian citizenship, and whether presidential decrees should have the status of laws. All three proposals were approved.

Background
On 5 May 1992 the Crimean Supreme Council declared independence, dependent on a referendum that was planned for August. However, the Ukrainian Parliament ruled that the declaration was illegal, and gave the Supreme Council a deadline of 20 May to rescind it. Although the Supreme Council complied with the order on 22 May, the referendum was only postponed rather than cancelled.

The referendum idea was resurrected in 1994 after Yuriy Meshkov was elected President of Crimea in January. Although the Central Election Commission of Ukraine and Ukrainian President Leonid Kravchuk declared it illegal, it still went ahead on 27 March.

Results

Greater autonomy

Dual citizenship

Edicts of the president to become laws

References

1994 referendums
1994 elections in Ukraine
Referendums in Crimea
Referendums in Ukraine